Yamskoye is a rural locality (a village) in Matveyevsky Selsoviet, Kushnarenkovsky District, Bashkortostan, Russia. The population was 80 as of 2010. There is 1 street.

Geography 
Yamskoye is located 21 km northwest of Kushnarenkovo (the district's administrative centre) by road. Bardovka is the nearest rural locality.

References 

Rural localities in Kushnarenkovsky District